The MPL Philippines Season 7 was the seventh season of the Mobile Legends Professional League (MPL) in the Philippines and the seventh iteration of the tournament.. At that time, Bren Esports, who came off from a victorious run in the M2 World Championship securing a historic championship for the Philippines, were the defending champions as they have defeated Execration in the previous season 6, 4 games to 2. The season began on March 19, 2021, and concluded with the final game of the season's playoffs, the grand finals, with Blacklist International securing the league championship against Execration after a full-seven game in a best-of-seven championship series, 4 games to 3, to claim its maiden championship. This was the final season that the promotion and relegation system was used as starting in eighth season, the league turned into a professional franchise-based league.

Background 
M2 World Champions Bren Esports were deemed as the favorites to repeat as MPL-PH Champions for this season, as the squad have won the MLBB M2 World Championships in Singapore earlier on January 24, 2021, taking down Myanmar's Burmese Ghouls, 4 games to 3 in a best-of-7 championship series. They also have beaten Execration in the previous season in six games, 4 games to 2 to claim its maiden championship.

 This was the first MPL appearance for Playbook Esports and Work Auster Force, that qualified from the Open Qualifiers which saw thousands of teams across the country fight for a spot in the league.

Regular season 
The ten teams were divided into two groups of five teams each. Teams within the same group played a double round robin format, meeting them twice (8 games) and all teams played against the another group in a single round robin format, meeting them once (5 games), for a total of 13 games played by each team in the regular season.

Standings

Group A

Group B

Playoffs 
With the playoffs being held still entirely online due to the threat of the ongoing COVID-19 pandemic, all games were cast inside the MPL Arena.
 The top two teams in each group qualified for the Upper Bracket Playoffs
 The next two teams in each group qualified for the Lower Bracket Playoffs
 All games in the playoffs were in a  format, except for the Grand Finals
 Grand Final was a  series

Bracket

Playoff Matchup Results 
Reference:

Day No. 1 

|}

Day No. 2 

|}

Day No. 3 

|}

Day No. 4 

|}

Day No. 5 and Grand Finals 

|}

References 

Esports competitions in the Philippines
Mobile Legends: Bang Bang competitions
2021 in Philippine sport